Langley Speedway may refer to a number of racetracks:

Langley Speedway (British Columbia), Langley, British Columbia (1978 last NASCAR Winston West race)
Langley Speedway (Virginia), Hampton, Virginia, hosted the final Grand National race before the series was renamed Winston Cup (November 1970)